Time Life, with sister subsidiaries StarVista Live and Lifestyle Products Group, a holding of Direct Holdings Global LLC, is an American production company and direct marketer conglomerate, that is known for selling books, music, video/DVD, and multimedia products. The current focus of the group is music, video, and entertainment experiences (such as the StarVista cruises) as the Time Life book division closed in 2001. Its products have been sold throughout North America, Europe, Australia, and Asia through television, print, retail, the Internet, telemarketing, and direct sales. Current operations are focused in the US and Canada with limited retail distribution overseas.

Overview 
Time Life was founded in 1961 as the book marketing division of Time, Incorporated. It took its name from Time Inc.'s cornerstone magazines, Time and Life, two of the most popular magazines of the era, but remained independent from both. Starting in 1967, Time Life combined its book offerings with music collections (two to five records) and packaged them as a sturdy box set. After Walter Wanger's death in 1968, its Time Life Films subsidiary also acquired his production company Walter Wanger Productions and many of its films. Throughout the 1970s and 1980s, the selection of books, music and videos grew and diversified into more genres. When record labels were no longer producing vinyl albums in 1990, Time Life transitioned to CD. In the mid-1990s, Time Life acquired Heartland Music, with the Heartland Music label now appearing as a brand. This company was subsequently sold off and is no longer associated with Time Life.

At the end of 2003 Time Life was acquired by Ripplewood Holdings L.L.C. and ZelnickMedia to become part of Direct Holdings Worldwide L.L.C. Direct Holdings Americas Inc. operates as a leader in the sale of music and video products under the Time Life brand. Since 2003, Direct Holdings US Corp is the legal name of Time Life, is no longer owned by its former parent Time Warner, later Time Inc. on June 9, 2014. In March 2007 Ripplewood led a group that took The Reader's Digest Association private and treated Time Life as a division of RDA. By 2003 onward, a disclaimer on the copyright stated that it is "not affiliated with Time Warner Inc. or Time Inc.," which owns the Time and Life magazines, which this company name came from.

In addition to the company's film and music core activities, it was also the holding company of television and radio combo stations. Stations the company owned were KLZ-TV-AM-FM in Denver, WFBM-TV-AM-FM in Indianapolis, WOOD-TV-AM in Grand Rapids, Michigan, KERO-TV in Bakersfield, California, and KOGO-TV-AM-FM in San Diego, many of which were sold to McGraw-Hill in 1972; however, Time Life kept WOOD-TV, which became WOTV after the sale of the other stations, and remained owned by the company until 1984. Time Life was based in the Time Life building in Rockefeller Center.

In 2013 Reader's Digest Association sold Time Life to Mosaic Media Investment Partners.

Book series 
As Time Life Books, the company gained fame as a seller of book series that would be mailed to households in monthly installments, operating as book sales clubs, and known as the direct-to-consumer business model. The original publisher, Jerome Hardy, declared early on that the publisher would succeed through a strategy to "give the customer more than he has any right to expect." Several of these book series garnered substantial critical acclaim unusual for a mass-market mail order house. For example, the series Library of Photography of the early-1970s featured very high-quality duotone printing for its black-and-white reproductions in its original edition, and was of course able to draw on Lifes vast archive of journalistic and art photographs from virtually every major photographer; Foods Of The World featured contributions by M. F. K. Fisher, James Beard, Julia Child, Craig Claiborne, and many others; and The Good Cook series, edited by Richard Olney, featured contributions from Jeremiah Tower, fe Grigson, Michel Lemonnier, and many others. Another series of high regard covered nature and the sciences, as well as the history of world civilizations. The science books are interesting as ephemera of their time. The content of these series was more or less encyclopedic, providing the basics of the subjects in the way it might be done in a lecture aimed at the general public. There was also a series on contemporary life in various countries of the world. Some other series are much less highly regarded, especially the later output as the publisher moved away from soberly presented science and history toward sensationalism, pop history, and DIY-themed books. The books, whatever their quality, are easy to find at low prices on the used-book market, due to their being published in millions of copies. (Some of the items in this list may also be single books not in a series, but followed the same types of themes as the book series.)

Yet, in some series it is known that a particular title in the series enjoyed a much smaller print run than the other volumes in the series, resulting in the after-market value of that particular volume and/or the set as a whole increasing. Examples include fourteen-volume "40th Anniversary Edition" The Civil War: A Narrative and the 18-volume Voices of the Civil War series, where the volumes "Petersburg Siege to Bentonville" and "Shenandoah 1864" are the rarer ones respectively.

Non-USA-specific topic series were habitually translated into other languages (French being the most predominant, due to Time Life's desire to have to bordering French-Canada served as well), and disseminated through local branches of Time-Life Books in the intended target markets. For some, usually smaller language areas, Time Life resorted sometimes to licensing out their publications to local publishers, as was for example the case with The Old West and The Enchanted World series. However, not rarely were these translated versions truncated for various reasons. The Dutch language versions—disseminated through Time-Life Books [International] BV, Amsterdam, the local branch for mainland Europe at the time located at Ottho Heldringstraat 5, 1066 AZ Amsterdam, Netherlands—of History of the World (as "Time Life Wereld Geschiedenis"), The Epic of Flight (as "De Geschiedenis van de Luchtvaart") and The Enchanted World (as "Het Rijk der Fabelen"), for example, were shy of four, seven, and eight volumes respectively in translation, whereas the German-language version of The Old West (as "Der Wilde Westen," and, even though American specific, translated nonetheless due to the continued and unabated popularity of the Western genre in Germany), disseminated through the Amsterdam branch as Time-Life Bücher, was shy of seven volumes.

Of at least one book series is known that it was initiated by a local branch and not by the American mother company; the 1986–89 book series Australians at War was initiated by Time-Life Books Australia for that country, and therefore relatively rare on American soil.

Time Life no longer publishes books, as its book division, Time Life Books (including its foreign subsidiaries), was closed in January 2001. Time Inc./Time Warner, however, continues to publish similar material through Time Home Entertainment Inc., but as (oftentimes retail) single volume titles, instead of (direct marketed) book series.

Proprietary published book series 
note: most of the information on the book series can be ascertained through M. Legg's and M.L. Martin's websites, listed below

 American Country
 The American Indians (1992–96, 23 volumes)
 The American Story (1996, 6 volumes)
 The American Wilderness (1972–77, 27 volumes)
 Ancient Civilizations 
 The Art of Sewing
 Australians at War (1986–89, 16 volumes)
 Canada
 The Civil War (1983–87, 28 volumes, not the same as their 14-volume 1999-2000 The Civil War: A Narrative 40th anniversary edition)
 Classics of the Old West (1980-84, 31 volumes)
 Classics of World War II (The Secret War) (24 volumes)
 Collector's Library of the Civil War (1981–85, 30 volumes)
 Collector's Library of the Unknown (24 volumes)
 Curious and Unusual Facts
 The Emergence of Man
 The Enchanted World (1984-87, 21 volumes)
 Echoes of Glory (1991, 3 volumes)
 The Encyclopedia of Collectibles
 The Epic of Flight (1980-83, 23 volumes)
 Eyewitness
 Family Library 
 Fitness, Health, and Nutrition
 Fix It Yourself
 Foods of the World
 Fresh Ways
 The Good Cook
 Great Ages of Man
 The Great Cities
 History of the World (1991, 24 volumes)
 Home Repair and Improvement
 How Things Work
 Human Behavior
 I Love Math!
 The Kodak Library of Creative Photography
 Library of Health
 Library of Nations
 The LIFE History of the United States LIFE Library of Photography LIFE Nature Library, (25 volumes)
 LIFE Science Library, (26 volumes)
 LIFE World Library Little People, Big Books Lost Civilizations Mysteries of the Unknown (1987-91, 33 volumes)
 Myth and Mankind (1997-99, 20 volumes)
 The Nature Company Discoveries The New Face of War (1990-92, 9 volumes)
 The Old West (1973-80, 27 volumes)
 Planet Earth The Seafarers (1978–81, 22 volumes)
 The Third Reich (1988-91, 21 volumes)
 This Fabulous Century Time Frame Time-Life Early Learning Time–Life Library of America Time-Life Library of Art The Time–Life Library of Boating The Time–Life Library of Gardening Time Life Library of Curious and Unusual Facts Time Life Student Library Time Reading Program Three Hundred Years of American Painting Understanding Computers Voices of the Civil War (1996–98, 18 volumes)
 Voices of Triumph (3 volumes)
 Voyage Through the Universe (1988-90, 20 volumes)
 Wild, Wild World of Animals What Life Was Like The World's Wild Places Wings of War (26 volumes)
 World War II (39 volumes)
 100 Years of Hollywood Licensed published book series 
While the vast majority of published book series were initiated and produced by Time Life itself, the company also (re)issued on occasion series in similar vein as licensee under its own imprint that were originally produced and/or released by publishers elsewhere, typically for release on the US home market, though series with a British Commonwealth pedigree were released through Time-Life Books International Amsterdam, as mentioned in the colophons of the individual books. Aside from the translations, the English-language versions of the Commonwealth-derived series were published by a variety of publishers for the different English-speaking territories with Time Life as the USA designated one. These Time Life versions are far less common in the used-book markets than Time Life's own proprietary releases.
 [Cultural] Atlas of..., An Equinox Book (1991-1996, 19 volumes); series licensed from Andromeda Oxford Ltd, Oxfordshire, England – British series, conceived in the second half of the 1980s, dealing with the history and culture of territories and civilizations, predominantly related in maps.
 A Child's First Library of Learning; series of educational books based on a Japanese series by Gakken
 The Civil War: A Narrative – 40th Anniversary Edition by Shelby Foote (1999-2000, 14 volumes); originally a US 1958-1974 three-volume release from Random House
 The Illustrated Library of the Earth (1993-1996, 6 volumes, also translated and released in Dutch by Time Life); licensed from Weldon Owen Pty Ltd, Australia – essentially a deluxe and updated, or addendum version of the Planet Earth Series Understanding Science and Nature; based on a Japanese series of books by Gakken

Music
Time Life added music in 1967, selling box sets and collections through Time–Life Records. During the 1960s and 1970s, the collections released by Time–Life Records catered to an adult audience, with genres including classical, jazz, swing and orchestral music; and the music of operas and Broadway theatre. On occasion, Time Life offered popular music (generally pre-1955 music, as opposed to pop and rock music airing on contemporary hit radio stations in the United States at the time) in box-sets. Although there were television advertisements, Time Life advertised most of these sets in magazines, specialty catalogs and direct mail.

In the early 1980s, Time Life began branching out, offering a series of albums focusing on country music. The first series was 1981's "Country Music," with volumes focusing on a particular artist and featuring eight or nine tracks per album. Twenty volumes were issued, with many of country's greatest artists of the time (Charley Pride was the first artist featured) getting their own album. But until the mid-1980s, Time–Life did not feature a rock music-intensive series for customers, preferring to cater to older adults with conservative music tastes.

Pop music enters the picture
Time Life's first successful foray into rock music came in 1986, with a series called "The Rock 'n' Roll Era." Each volume in that series—like similar series that followed—focused on a particular year (in this case, 1955 through 1964—the early, pre-Beatles years of rock music), a stylistic trend or particular artist influential in rock music. Each volume had 22 tracks, and was said to contain the original hit recording by the original artist (although this wasn't always true on early pressings of the early albums in the series). The songs themselves represented the most important and popular songs from the period or subject featured. An essay published by Both Sides Now Publications noted that Time-Life's move into rock music came at a time when much of the adult audience Time-Life catered to grew up during the rock-and-roll era and, as such, the new series was consistent with its goal of catering to an adult audience.

"The Rock 'n' Roll Era" series was a big success, and by the time the final volume was issued in the early 1990s, more than 50 different volumes (including two Christmas albums) had been released. This paved the way for more country and pop music-intensive series, including "Country USA," "Classic Rock," "Sounds of the Seventies," "Sounds of the Eighties," "Your Hit Parade" (a series featuring popular music of the 1940s through early 1960s) and "Super Hits." Like the earlier series, each volume issued had its own paperback booklet containing liner notes and information about the songs, with the addition of placement on various Billboard magazine charts.

Like the earlier box-sets featuring other musical styles and genres, the country and pop music series were advertised in magazines, catalogs and direct mail. By this time, some of these collections were advertised on television: either commercials or 30-minute infomercials. The television advertisements used slogans (e.g., "Relive your high school days ..."), clips of songs included in each volume (along with a scrolling list of other titles), a commercial spokesman (usually a performer or legendary disc jockey relevant to a given series, such as Rick Dees for a 1970s-intensive collection and Ralph Emery for a country music series) and testimonials from customers attesting to the quality and value of the albums, to pitch a given series. Key selling points of these collections are that each track was digitally transferred to the desired format using the original master recordings, as opposed to being "re-records"; and that the most popular and requested songs by customers could be found in a single collection (as opposed to a customer having to purchase many albums to obtain just a few desired tracks).

Customers were given a choice of which format they wanted their box set: either vinyl albums (through 1990), 8-track or cassette tape, or compact disc; today's box sets are offered only as compact discs.

While most of Time Life's box-sets and releases were critically hailed, there were also some minor faults pointed out by critics. For instance, several early pressings of the early volumes in "The Rock'n'Roll Era" series contained stereo re-recordings of the original hits (something that would be corrected on later pressings, either with the correct original recording or a replacement track). Sometimes, the most popular songs of a given time period were omitted, frequently due to licensing issues. Examples included The Beatles and The Rolling Stones for the Classic Rock and "Super Hits"/"AM Gold" series;, Garth Brooks and Shania Twain on various country music series;, and Prince, Madonna, Whitney Houston, Guns N' Roses, Bon Jovi, Janet Jackson and Michael Jackson on the main Sounds of the Eighties series.

Through 2010, several different series Time Life had offered were available on a subscription basis, either by calling a 1-800 number or sending a completed postcard-sized card and payment to Time–Life. Purportedly, the customer would get a specific volume (as advertised on TV or in a magazine) first, before receiving a new volume roughly every other month (on the format of their choice); customers and had the option of keeping just the volumes they wanted. In time, each volume was also offered for individual sale.

Several of the series – especially the pop, rock, country and rhythm and blues series – had retail versions for sale, released after the entire series was issued. Typically, these were sold at discount stores, often grouped in three-CD sets of 12 tracks each and having the most popular of the series' tracks, and cover artwork and naming loosely based on the subscription/catalog-exclusive titles. Additionally, the "Classic Country" series had special 15-track single-CD versions of several of its volumes issued for retail sale (in addition to budget 3-CD sets).

Saguaro Road Records

In 2008, Time Life launched Saguaro Roads Records as an in-house music recording label.

Under this label, albums have been released with Adam Hood, Blind Boys of Alabama, Bo Bice, Brandy and Ray J, Collin Raye, Dion, Edwin McCain, Hank Williams (estate), Jim Brickman, Joan Osborne, Lonestar, Marc Cohn, Mark Chesnutt, Patty Loveless, Rebecca Lynn Howard, Tanya Tucker, The Grascals, Angie Stone, Waylon Jennings and Don McLean.

Since its launch Saguaro Roads Records has had seven Grammy nominations. Notable releases include Patty Loveless's Mountain Soul II which won a Grammy Award for Best Bluegrass Album in 2010, Hank Williams: The Complete Mother's Best Recordings which was nominated for a Grammy in the Best Historical Album category in 2010, Joan Osborne's Bring it on Home which was nominated for Best Blues Album in 2012, The Beatles' "F1rst Recordings: 50th Anniversary Edition" which was nominated for Best Album Notes in 2012, and The Blind Boys of Alabama's Down in New Orleans which won a grammy for Best Traditional Gospel Album.

List of series
The following list shows many of the collections the company has released, but is by no means exhaustive.

 '60's, The
 '60's Country
 '60's Music Revolution
 '60's Gold (discontinued)
 '70's Collection, The (discontinued)
 '70's Country
 '70's Music Explosion (discontinued)
 '80's Collection, The (discontinued)
 '80's Music Explosion (discontinued)
 '90's Collection, The (discontinued)
 100 Christmas Songs for Kids
 100 Classics for Kids
 100 Classics for Relaxation
 100 Kids Songs
 100 Masterpieces
 100 Piano Masterpieces
 101 Sing a Longs for Kids
 American Gold #1 Hits
 AM Gold (2021)
 AM Gold (discontinued; was first issued as "Super Hits")
 Beethoven Collection, The
 Best of Soft Rock
 Big Bands
 Billboard #1 Hits of the '70's
 Blues Legends (discontinued)
 Blues Masters (discontinued)
 Bobby Jones Presents Ultimate Gospel 
 Body and Soul
 Body Talk (discontinued)
 British Invasion, The
 Classic Bluegrass (discontinued)
 Classic Country (2022)
 Classic Country
 Classic Drive (discontinued)
 Classic Love Songs of the '60's
 Classic Radio Hits (discontinued)
 Classic Rock (discontinued, was a collection of mid- to late-1960s music)
 Classic Rhythm and Blues
 Classic Soft Rock
 Classic Soul Ballads
 Classic Love Songs of Rock 'n' Roll (2016)
 Classic Love Songs of Rock 'n' Roll (discontinued)
 Classical Power
 Concerts of Great Music, The, AKA Story of Great Music Concerts, The 11 LP (5) volumes, 1966–68, (discontinued)
 Contemporary Country (discontinued)
 Country Jukebox
 Country Music Explosion
 Country Music Hall Of Fame Presents Classic Country
 Country Music Of Your Life
 Country USA (2011)
 Country USA (discontinued)
 Country's Got Heart
 Def Comedy Jam
 Dick Clark's Jukebox Gems
 Disco Fever   (discontinued)
 Disney's Greatest
 Easy '80's
 Easy Listening Classics
 Edge Of The '80's (discontinued)
 Emotion Collection, The (discontinued)
 Fabulous Fifties, The (discontinued)
 Faith, Hope & Country
 Feel Good Rock
 Flower Power
 Folk Years, The (discontinued)
 Forever '60's
 Forever '70's
 Forever Soul
 Giants of Jazz (discontinued)
 Girl Groups
 Glory Days Of Rock 'n' Roll (discontinued)
 Great American Songbook
 God Bless the USA
 Gold And Platinum: The Ultimate Rock Collection (discontinued)
 Golden Age of Country
 Golden Age of Pop
 Great Composers
 Great Men of Music
 Greatest Love Songs of the '60's
 Greatest Love Songs of the '70's
 Grooves (discontinued)
 Guitar Rock (discontinued)
 Hard & Heavy (discontinued)
 Heart Of Rock 'n' Roll, The (discontinued)
 Heart Of Classic Rock, The
 History Of Rock 'n' Roll, The (discontinued)
 I Can Only Imagine Platinum 
 Instrumental Favorites
 It All Started with Doo Wop (discontinued)
 Jukebox Memories
 Kingston Trio
 Lifetime of Country Romance
 Lifetime of Romance
 Legendary Singers
 Legendary Voices
 Legends Of Country
 Legends: The Ultimate Rock Collection (discontinued)
 Living the Blues (discontinued)
 Living the Gospel (discontinued)
 Magic of Love (discontinued)
 Malt Shop Memories
 Midnight Soul 
 Modern Rock Dance
 Modern Rock (discontinued)
 Motown Collection, The
 Mozart Collection, The
 Music of Your Life
 Mysteries of the Unknown
 Opry Video Classics
 Party Rock
 Pop Goes The '70's
 Pop Memories of the '60's 
 Pop Revolution (discontinued)
 Power of Love
 Power Of Love, The (1996) (discontinued)
 Prom Night
 Pure Rhythm and Blues
 Quiet Storm
 Raunchy Blues
 Rhythm & Blues
 Rhythm+Grooves (discontinued)
 Rock and Roll Hall of Fame 25th Anniversary Concert
 Rock Collection, The (discontinued)
 Rock & Romance
 The Rock 'n' Roll Era (discontinued)
 Rock 'n' Roll Era (2013)
 Rock 'n' Roll: Legendary Years (discontinued)
 Romancing the '60's
 Romancing the '70's
 Romantically Yours
 Secret Love
 Singers & Songwriters US version
 Singers & Songwriters Europe Version
 Smooth Soul
 Sock Hop Collection, The
 Solid Gold Soul US version (discontinued)
 Solid Gold Soul Europe Version (discontinued)
 Songs 4 Ever (discontinued)
 Songs 4 Life (discontinued)
 Songs 4 Worship Country
 Songs 4 Worship
 Songs For Lovers (discontinued)
 Soul Of The '60's
 Soul Of The '70's
 Soul Story (discontinued)
 Soul Superstars Of The '70's
 Soulful Christmas
 Sounds Of The '70's (discontinued)
 Sounds of the 80s
 Sounds of the Seventies
 Sounds Of The Sixties (discontinued)
 Sounds of the Seventies (discontinued)
 Sounds of the Eighties (discontinued)
 Sounds of the Nineties (discontinued)
 Spirit Of The '60's (discontinued)
 Story of Great Music, The, 11 LP (4) volumes, 1966–68, (discontinued)
 Story of Great Music Concerts, The, AKA Concerts of Great Music, The 11 LP (5) volumes, 1966–68, (discontinued)
 Summer Breeze Collection, The
 Superhits
 Superstars of Country (discontinued)
 Superstars of the '80's
 Sweet Soul of the '70's (discontinued)
 Teen Years, The
 Timeless Music Collection, The (discontinued)
 Time Life Loves The '80's
 To The Moon, a 6-record set:  a documentary with accompanying book about the early space program, the space race, the missions to the moon and the first moon landing, published soon after Apollo 11 completed its mission to the moon. (discontinued)
 Treasury of Christmas 
 Ultimate Love Songs
 Ultimate Oldies but Goodies Collection, The (discontinued)
 Ultimate Rock Ballads
 Ultimate Seventies (discontinued)
 Uptown Saturday Night (discontinued)
 We Love the Nightlife
 What Life was Like
 World of the Supernatural
 Woodstock Collection, The
 Worship Together
 Your Hit Parade (discontinued) 
 You So Crazy

Video
Time Life's video business has been growing quickly since 2000. Starting with documentaries including Growing Up Wild and the re-release of World at War, the company has more recently branched into nostalgic television shows. Time Life is able to leverage their music industry knowledge and contacts to release television shows previously held back because of expensive music rights clearances. Their collections are known for having extensive bonus features, liner notes and packaging. Television show releases from Time Life include:
 America A Look Back Barney & Friends The Jack Benny Program (50 episodes, plus 10 specials and 7 guest star appearances)
 The Beginner's Bible The Best of George Carlin (15 specials, plus 30 other guest appearances)
 The Big Comfy Couch The Ultimate Carol Burnett Show Collection (50 Episodes, plus the special Carol + 2 and the 1972 version of Once Upon a Mattress)
 The Clint Eastwood Collection
 China Beach (complete series)
 Cedarmont Kids CMA Awards Live (performance compilations)
 Dallas (seasons 1 to 4)
 Dolly: The Ultimate Collection (select episodes of The Porter Wagoner Show, the 1976 and 1987 incarnations of the Dolly variety show, Crook & Chase and other assorted Dolly Parton appearances)
 Great Films of the Bible Fat Albert Get Smart (complete series)
 Growing Up Wild The Real Ghostbusters (complete series)
 The Jackie Gleason Show (color episodes)
 The John Wayne Collection "Rio Bravo" (1959), "Sands of Iwo Jima" (1949), "Stagecoach" (1939), "The Cowboys" (1972), "The Green Berets" (1968) and "The Quiet Man" (1952),
 The Hee Haw Collection (select episodes and sketches)
 Lucy: The Ultimate 12 DVD Collection (76 episodes spanning I Love Lucy, The Lucy-Desi Comedy Hour, The Lucy Show, Here's Lucy and Life with Lucy)
 Looney Tunes: Library Mama's Family (complete series)
 The Man from U.N.C.L.E. (complete series)
 The Dean Martin Variety Show (select sketches and episodes, by agreement with NBCUniversal and the estate of Greg Garrison)
 The Dean Martin Celebrity Roast (complete series)
 The Mayberry Collection (select episodes from The Andy Griffith Show, Gomer Pyle, USMC and Mayberry RFD, plus the reunion movie Return to Mayberry and the backdoor pilot from The Danny Thomas Show)
 Midway Power Rangers: From Mighty Morphin' to Lost Galaxy (first seven seasons)
 The Ultimate Richard Pryor Collection: Uncensored (26 hours, spanning his television specials, The Richard Pryor Show and Pryor's Place)
 Motown 25 Rowan & Martin's Laugh-In (40 episodes)
 Saturday Night Live Tales From The Crypt The Six Million Dollar Man (complete series)
 The Red Skelton Show The Smothers Brothers Comedy Hour (Season 3)I Got You Babe - The Best of Sonny & Cher/The Best of Cher (selected episodes from The Sonny & Cher Comedy Hour, Cher, The Sonny & Cher Show from the ‘70s, as well as Cher... Special and Cher and Other Fantasies specials)
 The Best of Soul Train (Highlights from the '70s)
 The Tonight Show Starring Johnny Carson: Johnny and Friends (licensed from Carson Productions)
 The Wonder Years (complete series)
 Trials of Life Video Offer
 Robin Williams: Comic Genius (five HBO specials and compilation of other TV appearances)
 The Best of The Muppet Show (complete series), produced by Jim Henson Home Entertainment
 NOVA'' (1974-1985)

See also
 List of record labels
 Columbia House

References

External links 
 Official site
 
 
Time-Life research files on dance, 1920-1994, held by the Dance Division, New York Public Library for the Performing Arts.

Magazine publishing companies of the United States
Companies based in New York City
Companies based in Fairfax, Virginia
Former Time Warner subsidiaries
Reader's Digest
American record labels
Publishing companies established in 1961
Infomercials